Archyala culta is a species of moth in the family Tineidae. This species is endemic to New Zealand. It is classified as "Data Deficient" by the Department of Conservation. This species has only been collected at Opoho and is only known from its type specimen.

Taxonomy 
This species was described by Alfred Philpott in 1931 from a specimen collected by Charles E. Clarke at Opoho, Dunedin on the 17 December 1921. In 1939 George Hudson discussed and illustrated the species. The holotype specimen is held at the Auckland War Memorial Museum.

Description 
Philpott described the species as follows:

Distribution 
This species is endemic to New Zealand. This species is only known from its type specimen and at its type locality of Opoho.

Life history 
It has been hypothesised that larvae of this species inhabits dead wood, boring into it and feeding on it.

Conservation Status  
This species has been classified as having the "Data Deficient" conservation status under the New Zealand Threat Classification System.

References

Moths described in 1931
Tineidae
Moths of New Zealand
Endemic fauna of New Zealand
Taxa named by Alfred Philpott
Endemic moths of New Zealand